The 1873 Maine gubernatorial election was held on September 8, 1873. Republican candidate Nelson Dingley Jr. defeated the Democratic candidate Joseph Titcomb.

General election

Candidates

Republican 

 Nelson Dingley Jr.

Democratic 

 Joseph Titcomb

Results

References 

Maine gubernatorial elections
Gubernatorial
Maine